Motey-sur-Saône is a former commune in the Haute-Saône département in the region of Bourgogne-Franche-Comté in eastern France. On 1 January 2019, it was merged into the new commune Seveux-Motey.

See also
Communes of the Haute-Saône department

References

Former communes of Haute-Saône
Populated places disestablished in 2019